Jeffrey Hunter Morris (born October 7, 1988) is an American college baseball coach and former professional baseball first baseman. He is a volunteer assistant coach at the University of Alabama. Morris played college baseball at Auburn University from 2008 to 2010 for head coach John Pawlowski before pursuing a professional baseball career.

College career

Morris was drafted by the Boston Red Sox in the second round of the 2007 Major League Baseball Draft out of Virgil I. Grissom High School in Huntsville, Alabama but did not sign and attended Auburn University. In 2009, he played collegiate summer baseball for the Falmouth Commodores of the Cape Cod Baseball League (CCBL), and participated in the league's All-Star Home Run Hitting contest. In 2010 Morris was the SEC Player of the Year and a first team All-American by Baseball America and the National Collegiate Baseball Writers Association.

Professional career

Milwaukee Brewers
Morris was drafted by the Milwaukee Brewers in the fourth round of the 2010 Major League Baseball Draft.

In 2012, Morris was the Southern League Most Valuable Player after hitting .303/.357/.563 with 28 home runs and 113 runs batted in. He also won the Robin Yount Performance Award as the Brewers Minor League Player of the Year.

Morris was added to the Brewers 40-man roster on November 20, 2013. He was designated for assignment on January 19, 2015, without ever having appeared in a game for the Brewers.

Pittsburgh Pirates
On April 2, 2015, Morris was acquired by the Pittsburgh Pirates for a player to be named later.

Coaching career
On June 13, 2016, Morris became the student assistant hitting coach for Auburn. In 2017, he returned to the CCBL's Falmouth Commodores as an assistant coach.

Morris held the role of hitting coach at the University of Tennessee at Martin from 2017 to 2020. In 2021, Morris left the program to pursue another coaching opportunity.

On July 21, 2021, Morris joined the University of Alabama coaching staff as a Volunteer Assistant Coach.

References

External links

Auburn Tigers bio

1988 births
Living people
Sportspeople from Huntsville, Alabama
Baseball players from Alabama
Auburn Tigers baseball players
Falmouth Commodores players
Wisconsin Timber Rattlers players
Brevard County Manatees players
Huntsville Stars players
Nashville Sounds players
Indianapolis Indians players
Surprise Rafters players
Phoenix Desert Dogs players
Bravos de Margarita players
American expatriate baseball players in Venezuela
Arizona League Brewers players
Auburn Tigers baseball coaches
Cape Cod Baseball League coaches
UT Martin Skyhawks baseball coaches
All-American college baseball players